Rombach (in its upper course: Windwiesenbach, a part also Nesselbach) is a river of Baden-Württemberg, Germany. At its confluence with the Sauerbach west of Aalen, the Aal is formed.

See also
List of rivers of Baden-Württemberg

Rivers of Baden-Württemberg
Rivers of the Vogelsberg
Rivers of Germany